Lybster was a railway station located on the Wick and Lybster Railway in the Highland area of Scotland.  The station building now serves as the clubhouse for the Lybster golf course

History 
The station was opened as part of the Wick and Lybster Railway on 1 July 1903.

The station had a loop, a goods yard with several sidings and a 1½ ton crane to the south of the passenger facilities and a turntable accessed from the goods yard.

The station was host to a LMS caravan from 1937 to 1938.

As with the other stations on the line, the station was closed from 3 April 1944.

References

Notes

Sources

Further reading 
 
 

Disused railway stations in Caithness
Railway stations in Great Britain opened in 1903
Railway stations in Great Britain closed in 1944
William Roberts railway stations